Dwight Ireneus Douglass (1884–1940) was an American mining engineer and short story writer who was one of four founders of Phi Kappa Tau fraternity in 1906.

Douglass was the son of a prominent Colfax, Illinois physician, David T. Douglass. He graduated from Colfax High School and attended college for two years at Ohio Wesleyan University, transferring to Miami University in 1904. He played football at Miami and became associated with a group of independent students who formed the Non-Fraternity Association which would evolve into Phi Kappa Tau.

Douglass maintained close ties with the organization he helped found until he entered World War I where he served as a sergeant with the 27th Engineer Battalion in heavy fighting where he was gassed. He returned the United States from France and attempted to take up farming in southern Illinois. About 1920, he disappeared and his family did not hear from again until sometime in the 1930s. In the meantime, he had married in Pittsburgh, Pennsylvania and later moved to Hammond, Louisiana where he died and was buried in 1940, having worked for the Veterans Administration and written short stories under a secret pen name.

References
 Anson, Jack L., The Golden Jubilee History of Phi Kappa Tau, Lawhead Press, Athens Ohio: 1957
 Ball, Charles T., From Old Main to a New Century: A History of Phi Kappa Tau, Heritage Publishers, Phoenix: 1996

External links

1884 births
1940 deaths
People from McLean County, Illinois
People from Hammond, Louisiana
Phi Kappa Tau founders
Miami RedHawks football players
United States Army personnel of World War I
United States Army soldiers
American mining engineers
Ohio Wesleyan University alumni
Engineers from Illinois